The Fifth Battle of the Isonzo was fought from March 9–15, 1916 between the armies of the Kingdom of Italy and those of Austria-Hungary. The Italians had decided to launch another offensive on the Soča (Isonzo) River.

Background
After four attempts to cross the Soča (Isonzo) river and invade Austro-Hungarian territory, Luigi Cadorna, the Italian commander-in-chief, organized a strong new offensive following the winter lull in fighting which had allowed the Italian High Command to regroup and organize 8 new divisions for the front.

However, it was an offensive launched not after detailed strategic planning, but rather as a distraction to shift the Central Powers away from the Eastern Front and from Verdun, where the greatest bloodshed of the war was occurring. The attack was a result of the allied Chantilly Conference of December 1915.

The battle
The attacks ordered by Cadorna for the 2nd and 3rd Italian Armies as "demonstrations" against the enemy, proved to be less bloody than those previously. The battles were fought on the Karst plateau, with the objective of taking Gorizia and the Tolmin bridgehead. The Italians were able to conquer Mount Sabatino from the Austro-Hungarians, but that was the only real gain they had made.

After a week of fighting that cost the lives of 4,000 men between both sides, the clashes ceased because of the terrible weather conditions that worsened the trench conditions and because of the Austro-Hungarian "punitive" offensive in the Trentino.

Along certain parts of the front, especially around Gorizia, skirmishes continued between enemy platoons until March 30 and beyond, in a protracted struggle that produced no clear victor.

Cadorna had called upon his Russian allies to keep the Austria-Hungarian units at bay on the Eastern front given Cadorna the chance to redeploy his forces at Trentino all the while abandoning the Fifth Battle of the Isonzo.

Aftermath
With the Fifth Battle of the Isonzo over the Italians now had to plan another assault. Cadorna put his sixth offensive on the drawing board after hearing promises of resupply from Italy's Allies.

See also
First Battle of the Isonzo – June 23 – July 7, 1915
Second Battle of the Isonzo – July 18 – August 3, 1915
Third Battle of the Isonzo – October 18 – November 3, 1915
Fourth Battle of the Isonzo – November 10 – December 2, 1915
Sixth Battle of the Isonzo – August 6–17, 1916
Seventh Battle of the Isonzo – September 14–17, 1916
Eighth Battle of the Isonzo – October 10–12, 1916
Ninth Battle of the Isonzo – November 1–4, 1916
Tenth Battle of the Isonzo – May 12 – June 8, 1917
Eleventh Battle of the Isonzo – August 19 – September 12, 1917
Twelfth Battle of the Isonzo – October 24 – November 7, 1917, also known as the Battle of Caporetto

References

Further reading

External links
FirstWorldWar.Com: The Battles of the Isonzo, 1915–17
Battlefield Maps: Italian Front
11 battles at the Isonzo
The Walks of Peace in the Soča Region Foundation. The Foundation preserves, restores and presents the historical and cultural heritage of the First World War in the area of the Isonzo Front for the study, tourist and educational purposes.
The Kobarid Museum (in English)
Društvo Soška Fronta (in Slovenian)
Pro Hereditate – extensive site (in En/It/Sl)

Isonzo 05
Isonzo 05
Isonzo 05
Isonzo 05
Military history of Italy during World War I
1916 in Italy
1916 in Austria-Hungary
March 1916 events